Adolph I may refer to:

 Adolf, King of Germany (c. 1255 – 1298), King of Germany from 1292 until 1298
 Adolph I, Count of Nassau-Wiesbaden-Idstein (1307–1370)
 Adolph I, Duke of Cleves (1373–1448)
 Adolph I, Prince of Anhalt-Köthen (died in 1473)
 Adolf I, Count of the Mark (c. 1194 – 1249)

See also 

 Adolf I (disambiguation)